George O'Brien was an English footballer. His regular position was as a forward. He played for Manchester United during 1901 and 1902.

External links
MUFCInfo.com profile

English footballers
Manchester United F.C. players
Year of death missing
19th-century births
20th-century deaths
Association football forwards